Greek National Road 85 is a national highway of Greece. It connects Rafina with Lavrio via Porto Rafti.

85
Roads in Attica